The Australian Labor Party National Executive is an internal executive body of the Australian Labor Party charged with directly overseeing the general organisation and strategy of the party. Twenty members of the National Executive are elected by the party's National Conference, which is the highest representative body of the party's state and territory branches. The other eight members are party ex-officio members. Members on the Executive may be officials of trade unions affiliated to the party, members of federal or state Parliaments, or rank-and-file ALP members. The ex-officio members are the National President, the National Secretary and two National Vice-Presidents (who are directly elected by Labor members), and the Leader of the Federal Parliamentary Labor Party, but of these only the party Leader has a vote.

The National Executive is concerned mainly with organisational matters. It does not decide party policy, which is determined by the National Conference. The National Executive does not elect the party's parliamentary leaders, which is done by a ballot of both the Parliamentary Caucus and by the Labor Party's rank-and-file members. The National President or Vice-President are elected by party members. Its most public role is to act as the final arbiter of disputes about parliamentary candidacies (preselections). On these matters the National Executive usually votes on factional lines. The Labor Right faction holds a majority on the National Executive, though it did not hold a majority at the 2015 National Conference.

The power of the National Executive extends to the reorganisation of a State Branch. For example, in 1970 to improve the party's chances of electoral success, the National Executive intervened in the Socialist Left controlled Victorian Branch, involving the sacking of State officers and dissolution of the Branch. Less drastic forms of intervention are more common, such as the final arbiter of preselection disputes. The executive has authority over policy as it can interpret the party’s constitution, platform and conference decisions.

Members of the National Executive
, the current members of the National Executive are:

Executive leaders

National Presidents

National Secretaries

Cyril Wyndam was the first full time Secretary. Prior to 1963 the position was not full time

References

National Executive
Executive committees of political parties